The following lists events that happened during 1939 in New Zealand.

Population
 Estimated population as of 31 December: 1,641,600
 Increase since 31 December 1938: 23,300 (1.44%)
 Males per 100 females: 103.0

Incumbents

Regal and viceregal
Head of state – George VI
Governor-General – The Viscount Galway GCMG DSO OBE PC

Government
The 26th New Zealand Parliament continued with the Labour Party in government.

Speaker of the House – Bill Barnard (Labour Party)
Prime Minister – Michael Joseph Savage
Minister of Finance – Walter Nash
Minister of Foreign Affairs – Michael Joseph Savage
Attorney-General – Rex Mason
Chief Justice – Sir Michael Myers

Parliamentary opposition 
 Leader of the Opposition –  Adam Hamilton (National Party).

Main centre leaders
Mayor of Auckland – Ernest Davis
Mayor of Wellington – Thomas Hislop
Mayor of Christchurch – Robert Macfarlane
Mayor of Dunedin – Andrew Henson Allen

Events 

 29 January: (Sunday) Opening of St Peter's College, Auckland by Bishop J M Liston.
 20 March: William Snodgrass, a New Zealand politician, disappeared from the interisland ferry Arahura while travelling overnight from Wellington to Nelson.
 3 September (backdated to 9.30 pm): New Zealand declares war on Germany at the same time as Britain (though delayed until confirmation by the Admiralty message to the fleet).  
 31 October: The Strongman coal mine in Nine Mile Valley near Greymouth is officially opened by Minister of Mines, Paddy Webb.
 8 November: New Zealand Centennial Exhibition opened in Kilbirnie, Wellington 
 13 December: New Zealand warship HMS Achilles fought in the Battle of the River Plate against German pocket battleship Admiral Graf Spee.
 17 December: The Graf Spee is scuttled off Montevideo harbour.
The Poverty Bay Herald changes its name to The Gisborne Herald, which continues to publish .

Arts and literature

See 1939 in art, 1939 in literature

Music

See: 1939 in music

Radio

See: Public broadcasting in New Zealand

Film

See: :Category:1939 film awards, 1939 in film, List of New Zealand feature films, Cinema of New Zealand, :Category:1939 films

Sport

Athletics
 Clarrie Gibbons wins the national title in the men's marathon, clocking 2:44:56.2 on 11 March 1939 in Napier.

Basketball
A second interprovincial championship is held even though there is still no national association. (see 1938 and 1946)
 Interpovincial Champions: Men – Wellington

Chess
 The 48th National Chess Championship was held in Wanganui, and was won by J.B. Dunlop of Dunedin (his 5th title).

Cricket

Horse racing

Harness racing
 New Zealand Trotting Cup – Lucky Jack (2nd win)
 Auckland Trotting Cup – Marlene

Lawn bowls
The national outdoor lawn bowls championships are held in Auckland.
 Men's singles champion – W.C. Franks (Balmoral Bowling Club)
 Men's pair champions – J. Anchor, W.J. Robinson (skip) (Hamilton Bowling Club)
 Men's fours champions – C.F. Robertson, H. Franks, J.F. Benson, W.C. Franks (skip) (Balmoral Bowling Club)

Rugby union
:Category:Rugby union in New Zealand, :Category:All Blacks
 Ranfurly Shield

Rugby league
New Zealand national rugby league team

Soccer
 The Chatham Cup is won by Waterside of Wellington who beat Western of Christchurch 4–2 in the final.
 Provincial league champions:
	Auckland:	Ponsonby AFC
	Canterbury:	Western
	Hawke's Bay:	Napier Utd
	Nelson:	YMCA
	Otago:	Mosgiel
	South Canterbury:	Old Boys
	Southland:	Mataura
	Waikato:	Rotowaro
	Wanganui:	Wanganui Athletic
	Wellington:	Petone Football Club

Births
 20 January: Ken Comber, politician. (died 1998)
 27 February: Don McKinnon, deputy Prime Minister of New Zealand and Commonwealth Secretary-General.
 10 April (in England): Michael Cox, politician.
 24 April: Fergie McCormick, rugby union player. (died 2018)
 16 September: Tony Davies, rugby union player. (died 2008)
 23 September: Hugh Williams, High Court judge.
 23 September: Pauline Stansfield, disability advocate. (died 2022)
 25 September: David Walter, mayor of Stratford. (died 2020)
 4 October: Ivan Mauger, motorcycle speedway champion. (died 2018)
 29 October: Michael Smither, painter.
 18 October: Peter Brown, politician.
 24 November: Bob Jones, businessman.
 27 December: Hugo Judd, diplomat and public servant (died 2017)
 Raymond Ching, painter.
 Philip Temple, writer.

Deaths
 16 March: George Mitchell, soldier and politician.
 25 March: Annie Cleland Millar, businesswoman.
 26 April: Ted Howard, politician.
 26 July: Thomas William "Torpedo Billy" Murphy, boxer.
 27 July: Malcolm Champion, swimmer.
 23 August: Robin Hyde, writer.
 18 September: T. W. Ratana, prophet.
 3 November: David McLaren, politician.

See also
History of New Zealand
List of years in New Zealand
Military history of New Zealand
Timeline of New Zealand history
Timeline of New Zealand's links with Antarctica
Timeline of the New Zealand environment

References

External links

 
Years of the 20th century in New Zealand